Vernon Jackson or Vernon-Jackson may refer to:

Vernon Boulevard – Jackson Avenue (IRT Flushing Line), a New York City Subway station
Gerald Vernon-Jackson, English politician for the Liberal Democrats, leader of Portsmouth City Council
Vernon Jackson, former CEO of iGate, Inc., convicted of bribery in association with U.S. Congressman William J. Jefferson